Acanthoscelides tenuis is a species in the family Chrysomelidae ("leaf beetles"), in the order Coleoptera ("beetles").
It is found in North America.

References

Further reading
 "Catalog of Leaf Beetles of America North of Mexico", Ed Riley, Shawn Clark, and Terry Seeno. 2003. Coleopterists Society.
 Arnett, R.H. Jr., M. C. Thomas, P. E. Skelley and J. H. Frank. (eds.). (2002). American Beetles, Volume II: Polyphaga: Scarabaeoidea through Curculionoidea. CRC Press LLC, Boca Raton, FL.
 Kingsolver, John M. (2004). "Handbook of the Bruchidae of the United States and Canada (Insecta, Coleoptera), vol. 1". USDA Technical Bulletin, no. 1912, xi + 324.
 Richard E. White. (1983). Peterson Field Guides: Beetles. Houghton Mifflin Company.
 Ross H. Arnett. (2000). American Insects: A Handbook of the Insects of America North of Mexico. CRC Press.

Bruchinae
Beetles described in 1935